Troy Hernandez (born May 22, 1987) is a Canadian-Trinidadian soccer player who last played for the Baltimore Blast .

External links
 ESU profile

1987 births
Living people
Canadian soccer players
Canadian expatriate soccer players
East Stroudsburg Warriors men's soccer players
Brooklyn Knights players
Jersey Express S.C. players
Wilmington Hammerheads FC players
Baltimore Blast (2008–2014 MISL) players
Expatriate soccer players in the United States
USL League Two players
USL Championship players
Major Indoor Soccer League (2008–2014) players
Association football goalkeepers
Sportspeople from Queens, New York
Soccer players from New York City